The Women's Japan Ice Hockey League (WJIHL) is the premier women's ice hockey league in Japan. Also known by the nickname Smile League or Smile Japan League, it was founded in 2012 by the Japan Ice Hockey Federation and is contested in addition to the All-Japan Women's Ice Hockey Championship tournament. Nine teams participated in the 2020–21 season, of which eight were based in the northern island-province of Hokkaido and one in the Tokyo Metropolis.

The league’s most successful team, the Seibu Princess Rabbits, won the first eight league titles and have never placed lower than second. DK Peregrine are the only other team to have won gold and claimed seven of the first eight championship silver medals.

History

2012–13 season 
The first season of the JWIHL, 2012–13, was played in two stages: a placement tournament and a final tournament. In the first stage, held during 5 to 8 October 2012, the ten participating teams were divided into two groups of five and each group played a single round-robin of ten games. The top two teams from each group and the third ranked team with the higher point total from the first stage qualified for the top league and the remaining five teams competed in the lower league of the second stage tournament. The second stage was also played as a single round-robin and was held during 22 to 25 November 2012. The first champions of the WJIHL were the Seibu Princess Rabbits.

Teams

2020–21 season 

Team name history

 Peregrine
2015–present: Douro Kensetsu Peregrine (DK Peregrine)
2011–2015:  Mitsuboshi Daito Peregrine (MD Peregrine)
 Mikage Gretz
2018–present: Takasu Clinic Mikage Gretz (TC Mikage Gretz) 
2011–2018: Full-time System Mikage Gretz (FTS Mikage Gretz)

Past participants 

 Daishin B (Kushiro, Hokkaido)
 Daito Kaihatsu Nexus/Tomakomai Nexus (Tomakomai, Hokkaido)
 Ganba X Maria Jaspers
 Hachinohe Reds (Hachinohe, Aomori Prefecture)
 Makomanai Ladies Ice Hockey Club (Sapporo, Hokkaido)
 Queen Bears (Nishitokyo, Tokyo)

Champions

All-time medal count

References

External links 

 Official website of the Japan Ice Hockey Federation 
 League information and statistics from EliteProspects.com

Women's sports leagues in Japan
Women's ice hockey leagues in Asia
Women's ice hockey in Japan
Ice hockey competitions in Japan
Women's Japan Ice Hockey League